Crna or CRNA may refer to:

 Centre en route de la navigation aérienne, air traffic control centres across France
 Črna na Koroškem, a municipality in Slovenia
Cost-related nonadherence to medications, see Medication costs for a related article
Certified Registered Nurse Anesthetist, an advanced practice nurse with expertise in anesthesia in the United States
 cRNA, RNA derived from cDNA through standard RNA synthesis
 Center for Resilient Networks and Applications, a research institution in Oslo, Norway

See also
Crna Reka (disambiguation)
Crna Bara (disambiguation)